"It's Not Your Fault" is a song by American rock band New Found Glory, serving as the lead single from their fifth studio album Coming Home (2006). The track was first announced in July 2006, before the music video debuted on TRL on 1 August. "It's Not Your Fault" was released to radio on July 25, 2006. The song was later released to Modern Rock Radio in September, shortly before the album was released.

The single marked a musical departure for the band and was seen by critics as a step away from their usual pop punk sound, with the addition of prominent piano instrumentation.

Composition
"It's Not Your Fault" is a rock song at a length of three minutes and thirty seven seconds, written by the five members of New Found Glory, all of whom share credits for the music composition and the lyrics. The song is composed in the A Major key and has a "moderate tempo" of 129 beats per minute. The band's primary composer and guitarist Chad Gilbert, notes that the song has "big, full guitars and a piano line that goes throughout. It's pretty anthemic, and Jordan's voice has never sounded better." Gilbert further explained that, "This one shows how we've changed. We're a band who have done different styles of songs every record. There's some really metal riffs on Catalyst that aren't on Coming Home, and then this had some pianos. We're music fans, so we want every record to sound different".

Lyrically, the song is about dealing with time apart in a relationship. The band's lead vocalist Jordan Pundik has noted, "I want people to think it's about whatever they want, but for me, it's about when you're in love with someone and you're away from them and you have an argument or a fight and it's over the phone, so you can't console them."

Critical reception
As with Coming Home, "It's Not Your Fault" was warmly received by music critics. In a review for The Palm Beach Post it was noted that, "Coming Home is similar, in spirit, to the 1990s crooning of Chicago's brilliant Smoking Popes. Jordan Pundik's vocal delivery curls into sweetness, rather than a snarl. Wrapped around journal-entry cute lines on the  earnestly protective pleadings of "It's Not Your Fault." Rae Alexandra of Kerrang! magazine, was of the opinion that "It's Not Your Fault" displays "more maturity - and piano - than ever before. It's not fast, it's not forced, but - in an entirely new way - it sours." Jack Foley of Indie London was also favorable of the track and noted "the chiming piano chords that open "It’s Not Your Fault" give way into an effortlessly inspiring song about young love that unfolds into a majestic chorus."

Music video

The music video for the single was shot by long term music video director Brett Simon  (Sugarcult, Queens of the Stone Age, The Killers). The video depicts the band performing the song live on several occasions (see screenshot), in between a story being revealed in reverse chronological order. The story portrays a man and woman (played by Teddy Van Deusen and Heide Lindgren from the American reality show 8th & Ocean), who wake up in bed naked together, and proceed to retrace their steps and retain their several items of clothing along the way. At the climax of the video, they end up where they first met in a record store and go their separate ways.

The concept itself was inspired by a German mobile phone commercial. The video idea came from the Axe/Lynx 24-7 spot, "Because you never know when (Getting Dressed)", that won "Gold Lion Cannes 2004" award. Chad Gilbert told Kerrang! magazine that, "It starts backwards, with a guy and a girl in bed naked, and then they put on their clothes, finding them strewn as they walk, until they get to their first meeting at the end. We just took the idea and went with it." The shoot was completed in one afternoon.

Track listing
All songs written, composed and performed by New Found Glory.

Personnel
Single
 Jordan Pundik — lead vocals, lyrics
 Chad Gilbert — lead guitar, composer, lyrics
 Steve Klein — rhythm guitar, lyrics
 Ian Grushka — bass guitar
 Cyrus Bolooki — drums, percussion
 Benmont Tench — piano
 Thom Panunzio - producer
 Paul Miner — engineering
 Tom Lord-Alge — mixing
 Ted Jensen — mastering
 Autumn de Wilde — photography

Video
 Jordan Pundik — himself, band member
 Chad Gilbert — himself, band member
 Steve Klein — himself, band member
 Ian Grushka — himself, band member
 Cyrus Bolooki — himself, band member
 Teddy Van Deusen — boy
 Heide Lindgren — girl
 Brett Simon — director

References

2006 singles
New Found Glory songs
Songs written by Jordan Pundik
Songs written by Chad Gilbert
Songs written by Steve Klein (musician)
Songs written by Ian Grushka
Songs written by Cyrus Bolooki
Music videos directed by Brett Simon
Song recordings produced by Chad Gilbert
2006 songs
Geffen Records singles